Jerome Trevor Edmond (born September 28, 1969) is an American actor appearing in film and television.

Early life
Edmond was born Jerome Trevor Edmond in Encino, California.

Career 
Edmond has made appearances in Beverly Hills, 90210, CBS Schoolbreak Special, ABC Afterschool Special, Dead at 21, The Good Life, Silk Stalkings, Matlock, and Alien Nation. Edmond also appeared in the films Meatballs 4 (1992), Return of the Living Dead 3 (1993), Pumpkinhead II: Blood Wings (1994), Higher Learning (1995) and Lord of Illusions (1995).

Edmond was featured in the Return of the Living Dead documentary, More Brains! The Return to the Living Dead, released in October 2011.

Filmography

Film

Television

External links
 

1969 births
Living people
Male actors from California
American male film actors
American male television actors
People from Encino, Los Angeles